Peter Philip Carey AO (born 7 May 1943) is an Australian novelist. Carey has won the Miles Franklin Award three times and is frequently named as Australia's next contender for the Nobel Prize in Literature. Carey is one of only five writers to have won the Booker Prize twice—the others being J. G. Farrell, J. M. Coetzee, Hilary Mantel and Margaret Atwood. Carey won his first Booker Prize in 1988 for Oscar and Lucinda, and won for the second time in 2001 with True History of the Kelly Gang. In May 2008 he was nominated for the Best of the Booker Prize.

In addition to writing fiction, he collaborated on the screenplay of the film Until the End of the World with Wim Wenders and is executive director of the Master of Fine Arts in Creative Writing program at Hunter College, part of the City University of New York.

Early life and career: 1943–1970
Peter Carey was born in Bacchus Marsh, Victoria, in 1943. His parents ran a General Motors dealership, Carey Motors. He attended Bacchus Marsh State School from 1948 to 1953, then boarded at Geelong Grammar School between 1954 and 1960. In 1961, Carey enrolled in a science degree at the new Monash University in Melbourne, majoring in chemistry and zoology, but cut his studies short because of a car accident and a lack of interest. It was at university that he met his first wife, Leigh Weetman, who was studying German and philosophy, and who also dropped out.

In 1962, he began to work in advertising. He was employed by various Melbourne agencies between 1962 and 1967, including on campaigns for Volkswagen and Lindeman's Wine. His advertising work brought him into contact with older writers who introduced him to recent European and American fiction: "I didn't really start getting an education until I worked in advertising with people like Barry Oakley and Morris Lurie—and Bruce Petty had an office next door."

During this time, he read widely, particularly the works of Samuel Beckett, William Faulkner, James Joyce, Franz Kafka, and Gabriel García Márquez, and began writing on his own, receiving his first rejection slip in 1964, the same year he married Weetman. Over the next few years he wrote five novels—Contacts (1964–1965), Starts Here, Ends Here (1965–1967), The Futility Machine (1966–1967), Wog (1969), and Adventures on Board the Marie [sic] Celeste (1971). None of them were published. Sun Books accepted The Futility Machine but did not proceed with publication, and Adventures on Board the Marie Celeste was accepted by Outback Press before being withdrawn by Carey himself. These and other unpublished manuscripts from the period—including twenty-one short stories—are now held by the Fryer Library at the University of Queensland.

Carey's only publications during the 1960s were "Contacts" (a short extract from the unpublished novel of the same name, in Under Twenty-Five: An Anthology, 1966) and "She Wakes" (a short story, in Australian Letters, 1967). Towards the end of the decade, Carey and Weetman abandoned Australia with "a certain degree of self-hatred", travelling through Europe and Iran before settling in London in 1968, where Carey continued to write highly regarded advertising copy and unpublished fiction.

Middle career: 1970–1990
Returning to Australia in 1970, Carey once again did advertising work in Melbourne and Sydney. He also kept writing, and gradually broke through with editors, publishing short stories in magazines and newspapers such as Meanjin and Nation Review. Most of these were collected in his first book, The Fat Man in History, which appeared in 1974. In the same year Carey moved to Balmain in Sydney to work for Grey Advertising.

In 1976, Carey moved to Queensland and joined an alternative community named Starlight in Yandina, north of Brisbane, with his new partner, the painter Margot Hutcheson, with whom he lived in the 1970s and 1980s. He remained with Grey, writing in Yandina for three weeks, then spending the fourth week at the agency in Sydney. It was during this time that he produced most of the stories collected in War Crimes (1979), as well as Bliss (1981), his first published novel.

Carey started his own advertising agency in 1980, the Sydney-based McSpedden Carey Advertising Consultants, in partnership with Bani McSpedden. After many years of separation, Leigh Weetman asked for a divorce in 1980 so that she could remarry and Peter agreed. In 1981, he moved to Bellingen in northern New South Wales. There he wrote Illywhacker, published in 1985. In the same year he married theatre director Alison Summers.  Illusion, a stage musical Carey wrote with Mike Mullins and composer Martin Armiger, was performed at the 1986 Adelaide Festival of the Arts and a studio cast recording of the musical was nominated for a 1987 ARIA Award (for which Carey as lyricist was nominated).

The decade—and the Australian phase of Carey's career—culminated with the publication of Oscar and Lucinda (1988), which won the Booker McConnell Prize (as it was then known) and brought the author international recognition. Carey explained that the novel was inspired, in part, by his time in Bellingen:

Move to New York: 1990–present
Carey sold his share of McSpedden Carey and in 1990 moved with Alison Summers and their son to New York, where he took a job teaching creative writing at New York University. He later said that New York would not have been his first choice of place to live, and that moving there was his wife's idea. Carey and Summers divorced in 2005 after a four-year separation. Carey is now married to the British-born publisher Frances Coady.

The Tax Inspector (1991), begun in Australia, was the first book he completed in the United States. It was followed by The Unusual Life of Tristan Smith (1994), a fable in which he explored the relationship between Australia and America, disguised in the novel as "Efica" and "Voorstand". This is a relationship that has preoccupied him throughout his career, going back to Bliss (1981), Illywhacker (1985), and the early short stories. Nevertheless, Carey continued to set his fiction primarily in Australia and remained diffident about writing explicitly on American themes. In a piece on True History of the Kelly Gang (2001), Mel Gussow reported that:

It was only after nearly two decades in the United States that he embarked on Parrot and Olivier in America (2010), loosely based on events in the life of Alexis de Tocqueville. Carey says "Tocqueville opened a door I could enter. I saw the present in the past. It was accessible, imaginable." Carey continues to extend his canvas; in his novel, The Chemistry of Tears (2012), "contemporary London is brought intimately in touch with ... a 19th-century Germany redolent of the Brothers Grimm".

Controversies
In 1998, Carey was accused of snubbing Queen Elizabeth II by declining an invitation to meet her after winning the Commonwealth Writers Prize for Jack Maggs (1997). While Carey is a republican, in the Australian sense, he insists that no offence was intended:

The meeting did eventually take place, with the Queen remarking, according to Carey, "I believe you had a little trouble getting here."

The unhappy circumstances of Carey's break-up with Alison Summers received publicity (largely in Australia) in 2006 when Theft: A Love Story appeared, depicting the toxic relationship between its protagonist, Butcher Bones, and his ex-wife, known only as "the Plaintiff".

In April 2015 he, alongside Michael Ondaatje, Francine Prose, Teju Cole, Rachel Kushner and Taiye Selasi, withdrew from the PEN American Center gala honouring the French satirical magazine Charlie Hebdo with its "Freedom of Expression Courage" award. He stated that one of his reasons for doing so was "PEN’s seeming blindness to the cultural arrogance of the French nation, which does not recognise its moral obligation to a large and disempowered segment of their population." In addition, 204 PEN members, including Teju Cole and Deborah Eisenberg, wrote to PEN, objecting to its decision to give the award to Charlie Hebdo.

Awards and distinctions
Carey has been awarded three honorary degrees. He has been elected a Fellow of the Royal Society of Literature (1989), an Honorary Fellow of the Australian Academy of the Humanities (2001), a Member of the American Academy of Arts and Sciences (2003), and a Member of the American Academy of Arts and Letters (2016), which has also awarded him its Harold D Vursell Memorial Award (2012). In 2010, he appeared on two Australian postage stamps in a series dedicated to "Australian Legends". On 11 June 2012, Carey was named an Officer of the Order of Australia for "distinguished service to literature as a novelist, through international promotion of the Australian identity, as a mentor to emerging writers." And in 2014, Carey was awarded an honorary Doctor of Letters (honoris causa) by Sydney University.

Carey has won numerous literary awards, including:

ARIA Music Awards
The ARIA Music Awards is an annual awards ceremony that recognises excellence, innovation, and achievement across all genres of Australian music. They commenced in 1987. 

! 
|-
| 1987
| Illusion (with Martin Armiger)
|rowspan="2" |  Best Original Soundtrack, Cast or Show Album
| 
|rowspan="2" | 
|-
| 2015
| Bliss (with Opera Australia)
| 
|-

Bibliography

Novels
 Bliss (1981)
 Illywhacker (1985)
 Oscar and Lucinda (1988)
 The Tax Inspector (1991)
 The Unusual Life of Tristan Smith (1994)
 Jack Maggs (1997)
 True History of the Kelly Gang (2000)
 My Life as a Fake (2003)
 Theft: A Love Story (2006)
 His Illegal Self (2008)
 Parrot and Olivier in America (2010)
 The Chemistry of Tears (2012)
 Amnesia (2014)
 A Long Way From Home (2017)

Short story collections
 The Fat Man in History (1974)
 "Crabs"
 "Peeling"
 "She Wakes"
 "Life and Death in the Southside Pavilion"
 "Room No. 5 (Escribo)"
 "Happy Story"
 "A Windmill in the West"
 "Withdrawal"
 "Report on the Shadow Industry"
 "Conversations with Unicorns"
 "American Dreams"
 "The Fat Man in History"
 War Crimes (1979)
 "The Journey of a Lifetime"
 "Do You Love Me?"
 "The Uses of Williamson Wood"
 "The Last Days of a Famous Mime"
 "A Schoolboy Prank"
 "The Chance"
 "Fragrance of Roses"
 "The Puzzling Nature of Blue"
 "Ultra-Violet Light"
 "Kristu-Du"
 "He Found Her in Late Summer"
 "Exotic Pleasures"
 "War Crimes"
Stories from Carey's first two collections have been repackaged in The Fat Man in History and Other Stories (1980), Exotic Pleasures (1990), and Collected Stories (1994); the last also includes three previously uncollected stories: "Joe" (Australian New Writing, 1973),  "A Million Dollars Worth of Amphetamines" (Nation Review, 1975), and "Concerning the Greek Tyrant" (The Tabloid Story Pocket Book, 1978).

Uncollected short stories
 "Contacts" (Under Twenty-Five: An Anthology, 1966)
 "Eight Parts of a Whole" (Manic Magazine, 1970)
 "Interview with Yourself" (Manic Magazine, 1970)
 "Structure" (Manic Magazine, 1970)
 "I Know You Can Talk" (Stand Magazine, 1975)
 "The Mad Puzzle King" (Living Daylights, 1975)
 "The Rose" (Nation Review, 1976)
 "The Cosmic Pragmatist" (Nation Review, 1977)
 "The Pleasure Bird" (Australian Playboy, 1979)
 "An Abandoned Chapter" (Overland, 1997)

Contributed chapters
"A small memorial" In: Stories of Manhood: Journeys into the Hidden Hearts of Men edited by Steve Biddulph (2009)

Juvenile fiction
 The Big Bazoohley: A Story for Children (1995)

Non-fiction
 A Letter to Our Son (1994)
 30 Days in Sydney: A Wildly Distorted Account (2001)
 Letter from New York (2001)
 Wrong about Japan (2005)

Screenplays
 Bliss (1985, with Ray Lawrence)
 Until the End of the World (1991, with Wim Wenders)

Stage
 Illusion (1986, with Mike Mullins and Martin Armiger)

Adaptations
Dead End Drive-In (1986, adapted from his short story "Crabs" by Peter Smalley)
Oscar and Lucinda (1997, adapted from his novel by Laura Jones)
True History of the Kelly Gang (2019, adapted from his novel by Shaun Grant)

Notes

External links

 
 MFA Creative Writing, Hunter College, City University of New York
 Peter Carey at Random House Australia
 Guide to the Papers of Peter Carey at the National Library of Australia
 Guide to the Peter Carey Papers at Fryer Library, The University of Queensland
 Peter Carey Website maintained by Rebecca J. Vaughan and hosted by Flinders University
 The Literary Encyclopedia: Peter Carey
 
 Internet book List: Peter Carey
 
 
 Peter Carey on Bookworm Radio
 Peter Carey interviewed in Melbourne about Parrot & Olivier
 The Art of Fiction No. 188: Peter Carey, an interview in the Paris Review (Summer 2006).
 Peter Carey's favourite books

1943 births
Living people
20th-century Australian male writers
20th-century Australian novelists
20th-century Australian short story writers
21st-century Australian male writers
21st-century Australian novelists
21st-century Australian short story writers
Australian advertising executives
Australian expatriates in the United States
Australian male novelists
Australian male short story writers
Australian republicans
Booker Prize winners
Australian copywriters
Fellows of the Royal Society of Literature
Granta people
Hunter College faculty
Miles Franklin Award winners
Officers of the Order of Australia
People educated at Geelong Grammar School
People from Bacchus Marsh
Writers from Victoria (Australia)
Members of the American Academy of Arts and Letters